Robert A. "Maje" McDonnell (July 20, 1920 – July 8, 2010) was an American coach, scout and official with the Philadelphia Phillies of Major League Baseball. McDonnell was considered a face of the Phillies franchise.

Born in Philadelphia, Pennsylvania, he attended the city's Northeast High School. He attended Villanova University, where he also played basketball despite his stature. He joined the United States Army during World War II and rose to the rank of major, saw combat in the European Theater of Operations, and was awarded a Bronze Star, a Purple Heart and five battle stars.

McDonnell joined the Phillies as a batting practice pitcher in 1947, and was serving as a coach when the 1950 "Whiz Kids" won the National League flag — at that time, only the second pennant in Phillies' history. He was a member of the Phils' coaching staff through , working under managers Ben Chapman, Eddie Sawyer, Steve O'Neill, Terry Moore and Mayo Smith. He was a Phillies' scout from 1958 to 1960.

After working for the Ballantine Brewery and coaching at the high school and college level in the Philadelphia area, he returned to the Phillies in 1973, serving as a "ticket seller, tour guide, Phantasy Camp instructor, and the organization's face and voice in the community." He was thus part of Phillie teams that won NL pennants in 1980, 1983, 1993 and 2008, and its 1980 and 2008 world champions.

References

External links
 Coach's page from Retrosheet
 Kepner, Tyler, "An Energetic Presence on Hand for Every Phillies Pennant," The New York Times, October 26, 2008
 Morris, Jack, Maje McDonnell. Society for American Baseball Research Biography Project

1920 births
2010 deaths
American baseball coaches
Baseball coaches from Pennsylvania
Major League Baseball bullpen coaches
Major League Baseball first base coaches
Philadelphia Phillies coaches
Philadelphia Phillies scouts
Sportspeople from Philadelphia
United States Army officers
United States Army personnel of World War II
Villanova University alumni
Villanova Wildcats baseball players
Villanova Wildcats men's basketball players